Streptomyces cinnamoneus is a bacterium species from the genus of Streptomyces which has been isolated from soil in Japan. Streptomyces cinnamoneus produces duramycin A, duramycin B, duramycin C, carbomycin, cinnomycin and fungichromin.

Further reading

See also 
 List of Streptomyces species

References

External links
Type strain of Streptomyces cinnamoneus at BacDive -  the Bacterial Diversity Metadatabase

cinnamoneus
Bacteria described in 1991